Indigofera hendecaphylla, the creeping indigo or trailing indigo, is a species of flowering plant in the family Fabaceae. It is native to the Old World Tropics and Subtropics, and has been introduced to various locales, including Japan and Australia. It was widely introduced as a forage plant when it was thought to be conspecific with Indigofera spicata, and then shown to be toxic to nearly all livestock, with some uncertainty as to which species was tested.

Subtaxa
The following varieties are accepted:
Indigofera hendecaphylla var. hendecaphylla

References

hendecaphylla
Flora of Benin
Flora of Nigeria
Flora of Chad
Flora of Sudan
Flora of West-Central Tropical Africa
Flora of Northeast Tropical Africa
Flora of East Tropical Africa
Flora of South Tropical Africa
Flora of the Cape Provinces
Flora of KwaZulu-Natal
Flora of Swaziland
Flora of Madagascar
Flora of the Comoros
Flora of Réunion
Flora of Assam (region)
Flora of Bangladesh
Flora of India (region)
Flora of Sri Lanka
Flora of Indo-China
Flora of Malesia
Flora of Papuasia
Plants described in 1789